The Gravel Walk is a 1997 album by Tempest.

Tracks
One for the Fiddler (Sorbye)
Buffalo Jump (MacLean)
Bonnie Lass of Anglesey (Wullenjohn/Traditional)
Green Grow the Rashes (Traditional)
Flowers of Red Hill (Traditional)
Sinclair (Traditional)
Plains of Kildare (Traditional)
Trip Across the Mountain (Sorbye/Traditional)
Broken Ring (Sorbye/Reynolds)
The Karfluki Set

Credits
Lief Sorbye - mandolin, vocals
Rob Wullenjohn - guitar
Jay Nania - bass/12 string bass
Adolfo Lazo - drums
Michael Mullen - fiddle
 Robert Berry - additional keyboards
Album produced by Tempest with Robert Berry.
Vocal Production by Mike Wible and Patricia Reynolds.
Released by Magna Carta.

References

1997 albums
Tempest (band) albums